The University of Perpetual Help System DALTA (UPHSD) is a Catholic-oriented, co-educational, private university, with campuses at Las Piñas, Bacoor, Cavite, and Calamba, Laguna in the Philippines. The university offers programs in preschool, primary, secondary, tertiary levels, as well as short term vocational, technical, and special programs.

History

Antonio Laperal Tamayo, and his wife, Daisy Moran Tamayo, founded the University Of Perpetual Help System DALTA on February 5, 1975. The term “DALTA” in the name of the university is the acronym for Daisy Antonio Laperal Tamayo, the conjugal founders.

The founding of UPHSD was inspired by the parents of Antonio Tamayo, Jose G. Tamayo and his wife, Josefina Laperal Tamayo, who earlier founded what is now known as the University Of Perpetual Help System JONELTA, which has five campuses. The first campus established is the Perpetual Help College and Hospital in Manila to meet the local and international demand for nurses. Two years later (1970), the Perpetual Help College and Hospital Campus was founded in Malasiqui, Pangasinan, in response to the "government's program to promote health and educational development in the rural areas". This was followed by the founding of the third Campus at Perpetual Help School of Laguna, at Biñan, in 1976, and its medical school, the Perpetual Help School of Laguna Foundation. Thereafter, the Perpetual Help Campus at General Mariano Alvarez in Cavite, and the Perpetual Help Campus in Cauayan, Isabela were established, bringing the number of campuses to five.

Hence, the founding of UPHSD traces its roots to 1968 when Dr Jose G. Tamayo and his wife, Dr Josefina Laperal Tamayo, parents of Dr/General Antonio L. Tamayo, founded the UNIVERSITY OF PERPETUAL HELP SYSTEM JONELTA.

On February 5, 1975, just seven years after his parents opened the Perpetual Help College and Hospital in Manila, Dr/BGen Antonio Tamayo and Dr. Daisy Moran Tamayo founded their own Perpetual Help College of Rizal (PHCR) along Alabang-Zapote Road, in Las Piñas. The school was housed in a four-story building constructed in the record time of four months.

The initial academic offering of PHCR is Bachelor of Science in Nursing. Upon opening of the course, 700 students immediately enrolled.  This beginning for the infant school opened the way for its expansion in terms of curricular programs, faculty, research, community service, infrastructure, and professional development, leading the founders to convert the college to a university with the official name, University of Perpetual Help, Rizal (UPHR). Today, the former UPHR is known by its amended official registered and business name as University of Perpetual Help System Dalta (UPHSD).
 
In 1976, one year after opening of the PHCR, they established the Perpetual Help Medical Center (PHMC) about 200 meters from the University. Through the years, the PHMC metamorphosed into the University of Perpetual Help Rizal Medical Center (UPHRMC). Today, its amended official registered and business name is University of Perpetual Help DALTA Medical Center (UPHDMC).

Administration of UPHSD

Complementing the leadership and management functions of Dr/BGen Antonio L. Tamayo and Dr. Daisy Moran Tamayo are their two sons, Anthony Jose and Richard Antonio, both cum laude graduates of the University of the Philippines.
Anthony Jose M. Tamayo assumed presidency of the UPHSD campuses in January 2010.  He is a cum laude graduate of Accountancy in University of the Philippines-Diliman, a Certified Public Accountant, MBA degree holder from Kellogg School of Management, Northwestern University, and MA in Education degree holder from Harvard University.
Likewise, Richard Antonio M. Tamayo was appointed as President of the University of Perpetual DALTA Medical Center.  He is also the president of other DALTA companies including Dalta Builders, Inc., Health Care and Development Inc., Dalta Jonelta Foundation Inc, and A8 Travel and Tours.  He is the Executive Vice President for Administration for DALTA Group of Companies Central Office and Executive Director of DALTA Group of Companies, Zero Waste Management Committee. 
Richard Tamayo was a cum laude graduate of Business Economics in University of the Philippines-Diliman.  He is also a graduate of Squadron Officers’ Course (SOC) of Air Force Officers’ School-Philippine Air Force, and a Master in Business Administration-Health at the Ateneo de Manila University Graduate School of Business. He is currently enrolled in the Owner/President Management Program (OPM) of Harvard Business School in Boston, Massachusetts, USA.

University of Perpetual Help System
On April 20, 1997, the Commission on Higher Education (CHED), in its En Banc Resolution No. R 95–97, Series of 1997, granted university status to the  University of Perpetual Help System Dalta (UPHSD) at Las Piñas, and the University of Perpetual Help System Jonelta (UPHSJ) at Biñan, as  a single unit under the name “UNIVERSITY OF PERPETUAL HELP SYSTEM”, effective Collegiate Year (CY) 1997–1998.

Governance
The UPHS is governed by a single governing board of directors composed of 15 directors, of which 5 directors represent the University of Perpetual Help System Dalta, 5 for the University of Perpetual Help System Jonelta, and 5 for the UPH-Dr Jose G. Tamayo Medical University Foundation, with a single chairman of the board and CEO in the person of DR/B.GEN. ANTONIO L TAMAYO.

The board of directors governs the UPHS through a central office headed by the chief executive officer (CEO). The CEO created the executive board which directly formulates, implements, and supervises all policies, guidelines, programs and projects relative to the philosophy, vision, mission, accreditation, standardization of curricular content and instruction, quality assurance, professional development, faculty research, and community service, among others, of the UPH Las Piñas and UPH Biñan.

Both UPH Las Piñas and UPH Biñan have their respective presidents who act as chief operating officers (COOs) of their respective campuses. They both directly report and are responsible to the chief executive officer.

The University of Perpetual Help System DALTA is recognized by Philippine Association of Colleges and Universities Commission on Accreditation (PACUCOA) as the only institution south of Metro Manila to have the most number of Level III Accredited programs.

Campuses

Las Piñas campus

Formerly named Perpetual Help College of Rizal (PHCR), the 1st and biggest University of Perpetual Help System DALTA located in Las Piñas has a student population of around 12,000 students and employs about 1,500 teaching and non-teaching staff.  It offers more than 70 undergraduate and more than 10 postgraduate academic programs in addition to its primary and secondary academic offerings.

As an active member of the National Collegiate Athletic Association (NCAA) Philippines, it seeks and trains young athletes to compete in NCAA and to represent the entire system DALTA.

Molino campus

The 2nd University of Perpetual Help System DALTA (UPHSD) campus, the Molino campus was established and inaugurated in May 1995. Currently, the UPHSD caters to a student population of 4,000 - a dramatic increase based on its initial 700 enrollees. Standing in a land area of 6 hectares, the Molino campus is in Bacoor, Cavite.

Calamba campus 

The 3rd University of Perpetual Help System DALTA (UPHSD), the Calamba campus was established in 1996 with 360 students. To date, its enrollment has increased to 7,500 enrollees.

Academic Support

Performing Arts Group
PERFORMING ARTS GROUP (PAG)
The PERFORMING ARTS GROUP is the umbrella organization of all artistic activities in the fields of music, theater, and song and dance arts  for student-artists from various colleges of the University of Perpetual Help System DALTA.

UPHSD Chorale
The University of Perpetual Help System Dalta Chorale, formerly known as the UPHSD Singing Ensemble/UPH Chorale, is the official chorale group of the University of Perpetual Help System DALTA Las Piñas. It is composed of student-artists from various colleges of the university. It aims to propagate, preserve and develop Philippine culture and arts through music. The UPHSD Chorale performs different genres of choral pieces such as Broadway, Classical, Foreign and Local Folk songs, Philippine Ethnic Songs, Contemporary Music, OPM and Sacred Music. 
UPHChorale has been invited and performed in several events, and has made it to the stages of the Cultural Center of the Philippines for its open house festival : PASINAYA 2010 and PASINAYA 2011. The group has also been invited on many occasions to perform in a popular morning TV show “Umagang Kay Ganda” at ABS-CBN, a Filipino TV Channel and also performed during the plenary session at the Senate of the Philippines in 2016 and 2017. This has been a venue for the group to showcase their talent in a televised setting. Their current moderator/conductress is Ms. Jessica Love Dela Peña.

Sanlahi Pangkat Mananayaw (Folk Dance Troupe)
The Sanlahi Pangkat Mananayaw takes its name from two coined words, Isang Lahi which literally means, One Race. Composed of students from various colleges of the university.

Dulaang Perpetual (Theater Arts)
Dulaang Perpetual is the official resident student theater organization of University of Perpetual Help System Dalta - Las Piñas. It is a collective of young Perpetualiate artists and performers who create and stage plays from different theatrical genres, from contemporary to classical, and from experimental to guerilla performances (street performances) which shows the flexibility of the company and its student – actors. The current moderator of Dulaang Perpetual is Ms. Anna Pauline Monserrate.

Perpetual Dance Company
PDC in short, it is the official street/hip-hop dance team & representative of the University of Perpetual Help System Dalta - Las Piñas. To glorify God & to inspire. The team was formed on August 20, 2015 and PDC is Founded by Mr. Bobby John H. Salinas the Performing Arts Group Coordinator, and their current moderator, Coach Cristin Cruz Gapasin.

Athletics 

University of Perpetual Help System DALTA is a member of the National Collegiate Athletic Association (NCAA) since 1984. NCAA is an athletics association of ten colleges and universities in the Philippines. Students, faculty and staff members also participate in intramural and club sports, and use the excellent athletics and fitness facilities.

The University of Perpetual Help System DALTA is a member of National Collegiate Athletic Association (Philippines) since 1984 with UPHSD Altas as the team representing the school in various sports.

The moniker ‘Altas’ comes from the Latin word “high,” symbolizing UPHD's aspirations for further greatness. At the same time, it comes from the initials of the school founder, Dr. Antonio L. Tamayo.

The senior varsity teams for men are named UPHSD Altas. The junior teams are the UPHSD Altalettes, while the women's teams are the UPHSD Lady Altas.

Basketball
Since it has joined the league, the Altas basketball team had won two General Championships from their winning years 1995-1996 and 1996–1997 in two consecutive seasons.  They were able to reach the final four in the semifinals on NCAA's 80th season and in the 88th season under coach Januario “Aric” del Rosario.  The most recent time that the university hosted the tournament was in 2011 of NCAA Season 87: Brazen at ‘87. Echeke

Cheerleading 

The Altas Perpsquad nabbed the 1st Runner Up position in the National Cheerleading and Dance Championship National Capital Regional Qualifiers College Coed Division held from February 2 to 3, 2013 at the Music Hall of SM Mall of Asia in Pasay.

They also hold the most win in NCAA Cheerleading Competition with a total of 9 wins, 2 back to back win and a three peat wins. They also won in the South East Asian Cheer Open in 2015 bagging a Gold Medal title.

Pep Band 

Aside with the Altas Perpsquad, The Altas Perpscussionists serves as the school's main pep band, and is highly involved during basketball and volleyball tournaments in the NCAA, and during cheerleading competitions. The band celebrated its 21st anniversary in 2019.

Beach Volleyball

The Altas men's pair, Jay Dela Cruz and Sandy Montero, seized their first ever championship crown.  The Junior Team, Jherald Martinez and Cristopher Soriano, placed second in their barefoot fight in the beach volleyball finals.

Volleyball

In Season 88, the ALTAS and Lady ALTAS grab its two peat Back to Back Championship. The Lady Altas nabs its back-to-back championship  and the ALTAS continued its reign of the Championship crown for three consecutive years (NCAA Volleyball Season 86th, 87th, and 88th).

Campus Map

UPHSD Extension School at the Bureau of Corrections

The University of Perpetual Help System DALTA (UPHSD)’s 28-year-old Collegiate Extension School at the Bureau of Corrections in Muntinlupa is one of the corporate social responsibility programs of UPHSD and the Bureau of Corrections.  It has produced more than 400 inmate-graduates.  Many of these graduates have been released from prison and are now gainfully employed.

The program was founded by  Dr./Bgen Antonio Laperal Tamayo, chairman of the board and CEO of the UPHS and  former BuCor director Vicente Eduardo in 1984.  Currently, the UPHSD Extension school offers academic programs in Bachelor of Science in Entrepreneurship, Bachelor of Science in Business Administration Major in Marketing Management, and Computer Hardware Servicing  Course.

University of Perpetual Help Learning Center 

Located in Sitio Lawaan, Lumangbayan, Abra de Ilog, Occidental Mindoro, the University of Perpetual Help Learning Center Mission School provides the Mangyan tribe, the indigenous people in the area, with free education, inclusive of their uniforms, school supplies, learning materials, clothing and even other personal necessities.

It was envisioned by Dr./Bgen Antonio Laperal Tamayo to help the tribe gain an upper hand in the social ladder of life. Thus, instilling in them ideas of citizenship and promote further social and intellectual development.

The school has embarked into a Functional Literacy Program last June 9, 2012 and officially received its Certificate of Recognition last September 13, 2012 from the Department of Education (DepED) of Region IV – MIMAROPA Division of Occidental Mindoro, Mamburao, thereby becoming a part of the Alternative Learning System (ALS) and Projects.

Notable alumni
 Richard Gomez - An athlete, television presenter, director and politician, Currently mayor of Ormoc City
 Scottie Thompson - Active professional basketball player at the PBA with Barangay Ginebra San Miguel
 Ely Buendia - Singer, Songwriter, Director. Lead Vocalist of Eraserheads.
 Ted Failon - Politician, Journalist.

References

Private schools in the Philippines
National Collegiate Athletic Association (Philippines) colleges
Universities and colleges in Metro Manila
University of Perpetual Help System
Educational institutions established in 1975
Education in Las Piñas
Education in Bacoor
Education in Calamba, Laguna
1975 establishments in the Philippines